Yevgeny Mikhaylovich Novikov (born 1 February 1945) is a retired Russian swimmer who won a gold medal at the 1966 European Aquatics Championships in the 4 × 200 m freestyle relay. He finished seventh in the same event at the 1964 Summer Olympics. Between 1963 and 1965 he won five national titles and set five national records in individual and relay freestyle events.

References

1945 births
Living people
Swimmers at the 1964 Summer Olympics
Russian male freestyle swimmers
Soviet male freestyle swimmers
Olympic swimmers of the Soviet Union
European Aquatics Championships medalists in swimming
Swimmers from Moscow